Emil Handschin (19 March 1928 – 27 May 1990) was an ice hockey player for the Swiss national team. He won a bronze medal at the 1948 Winter Olympics.

References

External links
 

1928 births
1990 deaths
EHC Basel players
HC Davos players
Ice hockey players at the 1948 Winter Olympics
Ice hockey players at the 1952 Winter Olympics
Ice hockey players at the 1956 Winter Olympics
Medalists at the 1948 Winter Olympics
Olympic bronze medalists for Switzerland
Olympic ice hockey players of Switzerland
Olympic medalists in ice hockey
Place of birth missing
SC Bern players